Below is a list of current Commonwealth swimming records. This includes all countries that make up the Commonwealth of Nations. Of the 92 events, Australia currently holds records in 50 of them, Great Britain 16, South Africa 11, Canada 11, New Zealand 4, Jamaica 2 and Singapore 1.

This is not to be confused with Commonwealth Games records which are championship records attained in those Games only.

Long course (50 metres)

Men

Women

Mixed relay

Short course (25 metres)

Men

Women

Mixed relay

References

External links
Swimming Australia: Commonwealth Long Course records 3 November 2022 updated
Swimming Australia: Commonwealth Short Course records 9 November 2022 updated

Commonwealth
Swimming